Adhemarius ypsilon is a species of moth in the family Sphingidae. It was described by Rothschild and Jordan in 1903 and is known from Costa Rica, Mexico, Belize, Guatemala, Nicaragua, Venezuela, French Guiana, Ecuador, Peru, and Bolivia.

The wingspan is 89–117 mm for males and 107–126 mm for females. In Costa Rica, moths in this species take flight year round.

The larvae feed on several species in the plant genus Ocotea (including Ocotea veraguensis, Ocotea atirrensis, Ocotea sarah and Ocotea dendrodaphne).

References

Y
Moths of North America
Moths of Central America
Sphingidae of South America
Moths described in 1903